Nina Zulić (born 4 December 1995) is a Slovenian handball player for  CS Gloria Bistrița (women's handball) and the Slovenian national team.

She participated at the 2016 European Women's Handball Championship.

References

External links

1995 births
Living people
Slovenian female handball players
Handball players from Ljubljana
Expatriate handball players in Turkey
Slovenian expatriate sportspeople in Turkey
Competitors at the 2018 Mediterranean Games
Mediterranean Games bronze medalists for Slovenia
Mediterranean Games medalists in handball